Mingshan District is a district under the administration of the city of Benxi, Liaoning Province, China.

Administrative divisions
There are seven subdistricts and two towns in the district.

Subdistricts:

 Jinshan Subdistrict
 Dongxing Subdistrict
 Xinming Subdistrict
 Gaoyu Subdistrict
 Mingshan Subdistrict
 Niuxintai Subdistrict
 Beidi Subdistrict

Towns:

 Wolong
 Gaotaizi

References

External links 
 Mingshan District Government official website 

County-level divisions of Liaoning
Benxi